Steve Mikutel (born January 3, 1950) is an American politician who served in the Connecticut House of Representatives from the 45th district from 1993 to 2015.

References

1950 births
Living people
Democratic Party members of the Connecticut House of Representatives